Cercyridae is a family of Maricola triclads.

Taxonomy 
List of known genera:
Stummeria
Oregoniplana
Tribe Cercyrini
Probursa
Pacifides
Puiteca
Cerbussowia
Sabussowia
Cercyra

References

Maricola